Annie Cattrell FRSS is a Glasgow-born sculptor and artist. Cattrell often works with specialists in neuroscience, meteorology, engineering, psychiatry, and the history of science. Evidence of this approach can be found in Capacity, a work created while she studied corrosion casts, a technique used to show the structure of lungs, in Guys Hospital Museum of Anatomy. It has been shown both as an art object and to educate; for example, as a part of "Out of the Ordinary", an exhibition held at the Victoria & Albert Museum, and as an example of a fractal shape in nature, at a Royal Institution Christmas lecture.

Public art

Echo 
Echo is part of the Forest of Dean Sculpture Trail installed in 2008, commissioned in memory of Jeremy Rees, a founder of the trail.

Seer 
Seer stands in Huntly Street in Inverness, two resin blocks cast from rock faces on either side of the Great Glen Fault.

Transformation 
Transformation hangs on two sides of the New Science Centre building in Anglia Ruskin University.

Resounding 
Resounding is made of hundreds of cast resin droplets, suspended over a public area in Oxford Brookes University.

Solo exhibitions 

 From Within (2006);
 Fathom (2010);
 Transformation (2017).

References

External links 
 Annie Cattrell, ‘Transformation’ on vimeo

Year of birth missing (living people)
Living people
Women sculptors
Artists from Glasgow
Scottish sculptors